Kate Lloyd  may refer to:
Kate Lloyd, character in The Thing (2011 film)
Kate Lloyd, character in Wire in the Blood
Katie Lloyd, character in Boston Legal

See also
Katherine Lloyd (disambiguation)